Commerce School District may refer to:
 Commerce Public Schools (Oklahoma)
 Commerce Independent School District (Texas)